Chromobox protein homolog 5 is a protein that in humans is encoded by the CBX5 gene. It is a highly conserved, non-histone protein part of the heterochromatin family. The protein itself is more commonly called (in humans) HP1α. Heterochromatin protein-1 (HP1) has an N-terminal domain that acts on methylated lysines residues leading to epigenetic repression. The C-terminal of this protein has a chromo shadow-domain (CSD) that is responsible for homodimerizing, as well as interacting with a variety of chromatin-associated, non-histone proteins.

Structure 
HP1α is 191 amino acids in length containing 6 exons. As mentioned above, this protein contains two domains, an N-terminal chromodomain (CD) and a C- terminal chromoshadow domain (CSD). The CD binds with histone 3 through a methylated lysine residue at position 9 (H3K9) while the C-terminal CSD homodimerizes and interacts with a variety of other chromatin-associated, non-histone related proteins. Connecting these two domains is the hinge region.

Chromodomain 
Once translated, the chromodomain will take on a globular conformation consisting of three β-sheets and one α-helix. The β-sheets are packed up against the helix at the carboxy terminal segment. The charges on the β sheets are negative thus making it difficult for it to bind to the DNA as a DNA-binding motif. Instead, HP1α binds to the histones as a protein interaction motif. Specific binding to CD to the methylated H3K9 is mediated by three hydrophobic side chains called the "hydrophobic box". Other sites on HP1 will interact with the H3 tails from neighbouring histones which will give structure to the flexible N-terminal tail of the histones. Neighbouring H3 histones can affect HP1 binding by post-translationally modifying the tails.

Chromoshadow domain 
The CSD much resembles that of the CD. It too has a globular conformation containing three β-sheets, however it possesses two α-helices as opposed to just the one in the CD. The CSD readily homodimerizes in vitro and as a result forms a groove which can accommodate HP1 associated proteins that have a specific consensus sequence: PxVxL, where P is Proline, V is Valine, L is Leucine and x is any amino acid.

Mechanism of action 
HP1α primarily functions as a gene silencer, which is dependent on the interactions between the CD and the methyl H3K9 mark. The hydrophobic box on the CD provides the appropriate environment for the methylated lysine residue. While the exact mechanism of how gene silencing is done is unknown, experimental data concluded the rapid exchange of biological macromolecules in and out of the heterochromatin region. This suggests HP1 isn't acting as a glue holding the heterochromatin together, but rather there are competing molecules within that interact in various ways to create a closed complex leading to gene repression or an open, euchromatin structure with gene activation. HP1 concentration is higher and more static in areas of the chromosome where methylated H3K9 residues reside, giving the chromosome its closed, gene-repressed heterochromatin structure. It has also been shown that the more methylated the H3 lysine is, the higher the affinity HP1 has for it. That is, trimethylated lysine residues bind tighter to HP1 than dimethylated residues, which bind better than monomethylated residues.

The localisation driving factor is currently unknown.

Evolutionary conservation 
HP1α is a highly evolutionarily conserved protein, existing in species such as Schizosaccharomyces pombe, a type of yeast, all the way to humans. The N-terminal chromodomain and C-terminal chromoshadow domain appear to be much more conserved (approximately 50-70% amino acid similarity) than the hinge region (approximately 25-30% similarity with the Drosophila HP1 homolog).

Interactions  

CBX5 (gene) has been shown to interact with:

 CBX1, 
 CBX3, 
 CHAF1A, 
 DNMT3B, 
 HDAC4, 
 HDAC9, 
 Histone deacetylase 5, 
 Ku70, 
 Lamin B receptor, 
 MBD1, 
 MIS12, 
 SMARCA4, 
 SUV39H1,
 TAF4,  and
 TRIM28. 
 STAT5A,

See also 
 Heterochromatin protein 1

References

Further reading

External links